"¿Dónde Estás, Corazón?" is a song by Colombian singer-songwriter Shakira, taken from her third studio album Pies Descalzos. It was released in 1996 by Sony Music and Columbia Records as the second single from the album. Shakira and Luis Fernando Ochoa, her co-writer, earned the American Society of Composers, Authors and Publishers award for Pop/Contemporary Song in 1997 for the song. The song sold over 15,000 copies in Colombia.

Background
In 1990, a thirteen-year-old Shakira signed a recording contract with Sony Music and released her debut studio album Magia in 1991, which largely consisted of tracks she had written since she was eight years old. Commercially, the project struggled, selling an underwhelming 1,200 copies in her native Colombia. Her follow-up record Peligro was released in 1993, and suffered a similar failure. Consequently, Shakira took a two-year hiatus, allowing her to complete her high school education.

This song originally appeared on a compilation album called Nuestro Rock (Our Rock), released in 1994 in her homeland Colombia. This song turned out to be the only hit of the whole compilation album, and a music video was shot for the song, directed by Oscar Azula and Julian Torres. This meant her breakthrough in Colombia. Due to the success of this song, Sony Music gave her the opportunity to record and release a new album. The song was put on her album Pies Descalzos, and served as the second single when it was re-released in 1995 throughout Latin America. The song was remixed on The Remixes (1997) and was featured on Shakira's greatest hits CD Grandes Éxitos (2002).

Music videos
The first music video was directed by Oscar Azula and Julian Torres. This video shows Shakira performing the song in black and white, and later shows her in color dancing with a silver dress. This video was premiered in Colombia.

The other music video, directed by Gustavo Garzón, shows various scenes of Shakira holding photos, sitting in a red chair, singing in the rain, and shows other people in different scenes.

Charts

References

1996 singles
Shakira songs
Spanish-language songs
Songs written by Shakira
Songs written by Luis Fernando Ochoa
1995 songs
Sony Music singles
List songs